Gudem Kotha Veedhi is a village and a Mandal in Alluri Sitharama Raju district in the state of Andhra Pradesh in India.

Geography
It has an average elevation of 849 metres (2788 ft).

References 

Villages in Alluri Sitharama Raju district
Mandals in Alluri Sitharama Raju district